Joseph Moss may refer to:

Joseph G. Moss, judge and state legislator in Mississippi
 Joseph Rodney Moss (1903–1993), American judge in South Carolina
 Joseph William Moss (1803–1862), English physician
 Joe Moss (born 1930), American gridiron football player and coach
 Joey Moss (born 1963), locker room attendant for the Edmonton Oilers and the Edmonton Eskimos